Euro 1984 or Euro 84 may refer to:

Association football 
 UEFA Euro 1984,  the seventh UEFA [men's] European Championship, a competition held every four years and endorsed by UEFA
 1984 European Competition for Women's Football, the first UEFA Women's Championship